Valentina Belén Sánchez Trivella (born 19 June 1995) is a Venezuelan-American model, television producer and beauty pageant titleholder who was crowned Miss Supranational Venezuela 2021. She also represented the state of Nueva Esparta at the Miss Venezuela 2020 where she ended as one of the finalist. Sánchez represented Venezuela at the Miss Supranational 2021 competition, ending as third runner-up.

Life and career

Early life
Sánchez was born in Orange County, California to Venezuelan parents. In 1999, she moved to Porlamar, Nueva Esparta in her parents' home country of Venezuela where she grew up. Later on, she returned to the US, settling in Asbury Park, New Jersey and Spring Lake Heights, New Jersey, and attending Manasquan High School.

After the death of her both grandmother and mother, Sánchez has worked to spread the importance of taking care of mental health awareness at schools. She is also an advocate for the rights of the LGBTQ+ community; Sánchez has declared openly that her foster parents are gay men and has held conferences in schools in the state of Nueva Esparta regarding HIV awareness.

She speaks both English and Spanish.

Pageantry
Valentina represented her home state, Nueva Esparta at the Miss Teen Model Venezuela 2011. At the end of the event, Sánchez was crown by her predecessor, Valeria Vespoli.

Miss Teen USA 2014 
At the age of 18, on October 20, 2013, Sánchez participated in Miss New Jersey Teen USA representing Asbury Park, winning again a title. On August 2, 2014, held in Atlantis Paradise Island, Nassau, Bahamas, she ended as fourth Runner-Up in Miss Teen USA 2014. Gabriela Isler attended this event as the reigning Miss Universe.

Miss New Jersey USA 2020 
On November 24, 2019, she participated at the Miss New Jersey USA 2020 competition, where she placed as 2nd Runner-Up. Gina Mellish, another former Miss New Jersey Teen USA winner from Oceanport won the title.

Miss Venezuela 2020 
After being selected once again to represent her home state, Nueva Esparta, this time at Miss Venezuela 2020, Sánchez competed with 21 other candidates for the disputed crown, becoming one of the great favorites of said edition. At the end of the event, on September 24, 2020, she ended as a Top 5 finalist.

Miss Supranational Venezuela 2021 
She was selected as one of the five candidates in Miss Supranational Venezuela. On May 27, 2021, she was crowned by her predecessor, Gabriela de la Cruz, as Miss Supranational Venezuela 2021; this event was held in conjunction with the second edition of Mister Supranational Venezuela, where William Badell obtained the title.

Miss Supranational 2021 
She represented Venezuela at the Miss Supranational 2021 pageant, held on August 21, 2021 in Strzelecki Park Amphitheater, Nowy Sącz, Małopolska, Poland. For her national costume, Sánchez considered highlighting the neospartan devotion to the Virgen del Valle, honoring one of the most outstanding religious expressions of her native state; However, this idea also generated some controversy among the public. Valentina obtained the 3rd Runner-Up place, making the third time Venezuela enters into the group of finalists.

References

1995 births
Living people
American female models
American people of Venezuelan descent
Beauty pageant contestants from New Jersey
Manasquan High School alumni
Miss Venezuela winners
Miss Supranational contestants
People from Nueva Esparta
People from Orange County, California
People from Asbury Park, New Jersey
People from Spring Lake Heights, New Jersey
Venezuelan female models
21st-century American women